Philippe Paulin Kény (born 18 May 1999) is a Senegalese professional footballer who plays as a forward for Turkish club İstanbul Başakşehir.

Club career
On 17 July 2019, Keny signed his first professional contract with LB Châteauroux for three years. He made his professional debut with Châteauroux in a 1–0 Ligue 2 loss to Paris FC on 18 October 2019.

On 24 June 2021, he signed with Bandırmaspor in Turkey for one season with an option to extend.

International career
Kény scored on his debut with the Senegal national football team at the 2019 WAFU Cup of Nations, in a 1–0 win over Benin on 3 October 2019.

References

External links
 
 
 
 Berichonne Profile

1999 births
Living people
People from Thiès Region
Senegalese footballers
Association football forwards
Ligue 2 players
LB Châteauroux players
Tours FC players
Bandırmaspor footballers
İstanbul Başakşehir F.K. players
Championnat National players
Championnat National 3 players
TFF First League players
Senegalese expatriate footballers
Expatriate footballers in France
Senegalese expatriate sportspeople in France
Expatriate footballers in Turkey
Senegalese expatriate sportspeople in Turkey